The American College of Switzerland (ACS) was a business school and liberal arts college in Leysin, Switzerland in the canton of Vaud.

History
The American College of Switzerland, based in the Swiss village of Leysin (Vaud), was founded by Dr. Fred Ott in 1963.

Campus
The campus was housed in the modernized Victorian style building of Les Frenes, built in the late 1800s, which became a sanatorium of the Dr. Rollier health complex in the early 1900s. A private train station connected Leysin to all main lines and cities in Switzerland.

Alumni
Some notable alumni include Sylvester Stallone and Winthrop Paul Rockefeller.

Ownership changes
In the 1990s it was acquired by Schiller International University. In 2007, Knowledge Investment Partners Inc. acquired Schiller International University, along with the American College of Switzerland. The result was that in 2009 the American College of Switzerland was officially closed.

References

External links
 American College of Switzerland (Archive)

 American College of Switzerland Alumni facebook page only members can see who's in the group and what they post

Leysin
Defunct universities and colleges
Defunct universities and colleges in Switzerland
1963 establishments in Switzerland
2009 disestablishments in Switzerland